Gustave "Gus" Baheten Bahoken (born 13 June 1979 in Douala) is a Cameroonian football player, who last played for Mitra Kukar in Indonesia.

Career
Bahoken moved to Aalesund from the French team Angers SCO in 2005. Prior to playing for Angers, he had spent two seasons with Livingston in the Scottish Premier League.

Bahoken accidentally broke former Celtic striker Henrik Larsson's jaw at Celtic Park in an unfortunate head-to-head collision in a game in 2003.

In January 2009, he was given a trial at English League Two side Bradford City in a reserve game with Scunthorpe United.

International career
He was part of the Cameroonian 2004 African Nations Cup team, who finished top of their group in the first round of competition, before losing in the quarter finals to Nigeria. Bahoken was part of the Cameroonian squad that went all the way to the final in the FIFA Confederations Cup 2003 in France. He played only one full cap for Cameroon.

Personal life
His younger brother Stéphane Bahoken plays for OGC Nice in the youth side.

Honours

Club honors
Cotonsport Garoua
Cameroonian Championship (1): 1998

References

External links
 

1979 births
Living people
Cameroonian footballers
Cameroon international footballers
Cameroonian expatriate footballers
2003 FIFA Confederations Cup players
2004 African Cup of Nations players
FC Sion players
Le Havre AC players
Valenciennes FC players
Angers SCO players
FC Rouen players
Aalesunds FK players
Livingston F.C. players
Botev Plovdiv players
Expatriate footballers in Switzerland
Expatriate footballers in France
Expatriate footballers in Scotland
Expatriate footballers in Norway
Expatriate footballers in Bulgaria
Expatriate footballers in Indonesia
Swiss Super League players
Ligue 2 players
Eliteserien players
Scottish Premier League players
First Professional Football League (Bulgaria) players
Liga 1 (Indonesia) players
Cameroonian expatriate sportspeople in Switzerland
Cameroonian expatriate sportspeople in France
Cameroonian expatriate sportspeople in Scotland
Cameroonian expatriate sportspeople in Norway
Cameroonian expatriate sportspeople in Bulgaria
Cameroonian expatriate sportspeople in Indonesia
Association football central defenders